Gregory Scott Paul (born December 24, 1954) is an American freelance researcher, author and illustrator who works in paleontology. He is best known for his work and research on theropod dinosaurs and his detailed illustrations, both live and skeletal. Professionally investigating and restoring dinosaurs for three decades, Paul received an on-screen credit as dinosaur specialist on Jurassic Park and Discovery Channel's When Dinosaurs Roamed America and Dinosaur Planet. He is the author and illustrator of Predatory Dinosaurs of the World (1988), The Complete Illustrated Guide to Dinosaur Skeletons (1996), Dinosaurs of the Air (2001), The Princeton Field Guide to Dinosaurs (2010), Gregory S. Paul's Dinosaur Coffee Table Book (2010), The Princeton Field Guide to Dinosaurs: 2nd Edition (2016), The Princeton Field Guide to Pterosaurs (2022), The Princeton Field Guide to Mesozoic Sea Reptiles (2022) and editor of The Scientific American Book of Dinosaurs (2000).

Paleontology

Illustrations

Paul helped pioneer the "new look" of dinosaurs in the 1970s. Through a series of dynamic ink drawings and oil paintings he was among the first professional artists to depict them as active, warm-blooded and – in the case of the small ones – feathered. Many later dinosaur illustrations are a reflection of his anatomical insights or even a direct imitation of his style. The fact that he worked closely with paleontologists, did his own independent paleontological research and created a series of skeletal restorations of all sufficiently known dinosaurs, lead many to regard his images as a sort of scientific standard to be followed. This tendency is stimulated by his habit of constantly redrawing older work to let it reflect the latest finds and theories.  Much of it is in black-and-white, in ink or colored pencil. Sculptors have used these anatomical templates as a resource for decades, and still do today many unauthorized and uncredited Even one of his scientific critics, Storrs L. Olson, described him in a review in the Scientific American as "a superior artist". He was inspired by classic paleoartists such as Charles R. Knight, and has a fondness for the dinosaur restorations of the little-known artist Bill Berry.

Paul's line art and paintings have been published in over 100 popular books and shown in more documentaries than other modern paleoartists  including several television programs such as The Nature of Things, NOVA, Horizon, and PaleoWorld.

Research
From 1977 to 1984, Paul was an informal research associate and illustrator for Robert Bakker in the Earth and Planetary Sciences department at Johns Hopkins University in Baltimore. Paul lacks a formal degree in paleontology, but has participated in numerous field expeditions and has authored or co-authored over 30 scientific papers and over 40 popular science articles. Paul proposed that some of the bird-like feathered theropods were winged fliers, and that others were secondarily flightless, an idea supported by some fossils from China. Paul proposed the controversial thermoregulatory concept of "terramegathermy", which argues that only animals with high basal metabolic rates can exceed one tonne on land.  Paul has named the following dinosaurs, alone or with co-authors:

 Acrocanthosaurus altispinax (species, later renamed Becklespinax altispinax)
 Albertosaurus megagracilis (species, later renamed Dinotyrannus megagracilis, now considered a juvenile Tyrannosaurus rex)
 Aublysodon molnari (species, later renamed Stygivenator molnari, now considered a juvenile Tyrannosaurus rex)
 Avisaurus archibaldi (genus and species, with Brett-Surman; a bird)
 Giraffatitan brancai (genus)
 Mantellisaurus atherfieldensis (genus)
 Potamornis skutchi (genus and species, with Elzanowski & Stidham; a bird)
 Dollodon bampingi (genus and species)

Books

 Predatory Dinosaurs of the World (1988)
 The Complete Illustrated Guide to Dinosaur Skeletons (1996)
 Dinosaurs of the Air (2002)
 The Princeton Field Guide to Dinosaurs (2010)
 Gregory S. Paul's Dinosaur Coffee Table Book (2010)
 The Princeton Field Guide to Pterosaurs (2022)
 The Princeton Field Guide to Mesozoic Sea Reptiles (2022)
 The Scientific American Book of Dinosaurs (editor, 2000)

See also 
 Dinosaur renaissance
 Feathered dinosaurs
 Paleoart

Footnotes

External links
Official website
 

American illustrators
American paleontologists
1954 births
Living people
Scientific illustrators
Paleoartists
American atheists
Critics of religions
 
People from Washington, D.C.